Joelle Marie Gilbert (born 9 September 1999) is a Gibraltarian footballer who plays as a midfielder for Lions Gibraltar and the Gibraltar women's national team.

International career 
Gilbert made her senior debut for Gibraltar on 24 June 2021 in a 1–4 friendly away loss to Liechtenstein. She scored her first international goal against the same opposition 3 days later, in a 2–1 defeat.

Career statistics

International

International goals
''Gibraltar score listed first, score column indicates score after each Gilbert goal.

Other sports 
Gilbert has also competed in athletics and basketball for Gibraltar, first representing the athletics team at the 2015 Island Games.

References 

Living people
1999 births
Gibraltarian women's footballers
Women's association football midfielders
Cardiff Met. Ladies F.C. players
Lions Gibraltar F.C. Women players
Gibraltar women's international footballers
Gibraltarian expatriate footballers
Expatriate women's footballers in Wales
Gibraltarian expatriate sportspeople in Wales
Gibraltarian athletes